Alain Jean-Paul Mohammed Nasreddine (born July 10, 1975) is a Canadian professional ice hockey coach and former player who is an assistant coach for the Dallas Stars of the National Hockey League (NHL). He played as a defenceman in the NHL.

Playing career
Nasreddine played junior ice hockey with the Drummondville Voltigeurs and Chicoutimi Saguenéens of the Quebec Major Junior Hockey League (QMJHL). He was selected in the sixth round, 135th overall by the Florida Panthers in the 1993 NHL Entry Draft.

Nasreddine has played for six different NHL organizations, but mostly played in the minor leagues. He saw very limited NHL duty: he played fewer than 10 games each for the Chicago Blackhawks, Montreal Canadiens, and New York Islanders, but played most of his time in the NHL for the Pittsburgh Penguins, totaling 74 career NHL games. He scored his first and only NHL goal on December 16, 2006, as the Penguins fell 6-3 to the Canadiens in Montreal. In 2008, he signed with the Sinupret Ice Tigers of the Deutsche Eishockey Liga, and after two seasons in the DEL was released on June 12, 2010, following the 2009–10 season.

Coaching career
On August 20, 2010, the Wilkes-Barre/Scranton Penguins of the American Hockey League (AHL) named Nasreddine their new assistant coach.
 
On June 17, 2015, Nasreddine was named an assistant coach for the New Jersey Devils. On December 3, 2019, he was named interim head coach of the Devils. On October 2, 2020, he was retained as an assistant coach of the Devils after the hiring of Lindy Ruff as head coach on July 9, and served as assistant coach until his contract was not renewed on May 4, 2022.

On July 1, 2022, Nasreddine was named as assistant coach under head coach Peter DeBoer of the Dallas Stars.

Personal life
Nasreddine grew up in Saint-Leonard, Quebec, the son of Akram, a Lebanese Muslim immigrant, and Francine, a French-Canadian Catholic. He has one younger brother, Samy, who was also an ice hockey player. Akram owns a pizza chain in Montreal, Pizza Madonna, and has previously owned other restaurants and a convenience store. He is one of four NHL players of Lebanese descent, along with John Hanna, Ed Hatoum, and Nazem Kadri.

Career statistics

Head coaching record

NHL

References

External links
 

1975 births
Living people
Bridgeport Sound Tigers players
Canadian ice hockey coaches
Canadian ice hockey defencemen
Canadian people of Lebanese descent
Carolina Monarchs players
Chicago Blackhawks players
Chicoutimi Saguenéens (QMJHL) players
Dallas Stars coaches
Drummondville Voltigeurs players
Florida Panthers draft picks
Fredericton Canadiens players
Hamilton Bulldogs (AHL) players
Ice hockey people from Montreal
Indianapolis Ice players
Montreal Canadiens players
New Jersey Devils coaches
New York Islanders players
Pittsburgh Penguins players
Portland Pirates players
Quebec Citadelles players
Wilkes-Barre/Scranton Penguins players
Sportspeople of Lebanese descent